The 1909 Baylor football team was an American football team that represented Baylor University as an independent during the 1909 college football season. In its second season under head coach Enoch J. Mills, the team compiled a 5–3 record and outscored opponent by a total of 112 to 41.

1909 was only the second season in which Baylor's first six games were at home; since then, Baylor has not begun the season with more than four home games. The season is prominent for having the world's first "Home-Coming" at the Thanksgiving Day game, which included a concert, parade, and bonfire.  To this day, Baylor claims to have the largest homecoming parade in the world.

Schedule

References

Baylor
Baylor Bears football seasons
Baylor Bears football